Bustanayevo (Bośtanay) is a rural locality (a village) in Kuzbayevsky Selsoviet, Burayevsky District, Bashkortostan, Russia. The population was 156 as of 2010. There are 5 streets.

Geography 
Bustanayevo is located 16 km northwest of Burayevo (the district's administrative centre) by road. Abdullino is the nearest rural locality.

References 

Rural localities in Burayevsky District